Adelelm (died 25 February 1179) also known as Adelmus or Ascelinus, was Treasurer of England and nephew of Roger, Bishop of Salisbury. He was also Archdeacon of Dorset (bef. 1139–aft. 1173) and later Dean of Lincoln (bef. 1145–aft. 1173). He was appointed Treasurer around 1136 and was dismissed from office in 1139. During this time he appears to have been made a prebendary of Aylesbury.

Citations

References
 British History Online Bishops of Salisbury accessed on 30 October 2007
 

Lord High Treasurers of England
Deans of Lincoln
Archdeacons of Dorset
Year of birth missing
1179 deaths
12th-century English Roman Catholic priests